In mathematics, a meander or closed meander is a self-avoiding closed curve which intersects a line a number of times.  Intuitively, a meander can be viewed as a road crossing a river through a number of bridges.

Meander

Given a fixed oriented line L in the Euclidean plane R2, a meander of order n is a non-self-intersecting closed curve in R2 which transversally intersects the line at 2n points for some positive integer n. The line and curve together form a meandric system.  Two meanders are said to be equivalent if there is a homeomorphism of the whole plane that takes L to itself and takes one meander to the other.

Examples

The meander of order 1 intersects the line twice:

The meanders of order 2 intersect the line four times.

Meandric numbers

The number of distinct meanders of order n is the meandric number Mn. The first fifteen meandric numbers are given below .

M1 = 1
M2 = 1
M3 = 2 
M4 = 8
M5 = 42
M6 = 262
M7 = 1828
M8 = 13820
M9 = 110954
M10 = 933458
M11 = 8152860
M12 = 73424650
M13 = 678390116
M14 = 6405031050
M15 = 61606881612

Meandric permutations

A meandric permutation of order n is defined on the set {1, 2, ..., 2n} and is determined by a meandric system in the following way:
 With the line oriented from left to right, each intersection of the meander is consecutively labelled with the integers, starting at 1.
 The curve is oriented upward at the intersection labelled 1.
 The cyclic permutation with no fixed points is obtained by following the oriented curve through the labelled intersection points.

In the diagram on the right, the order 4 meandric permutation is given by (1 8 5 4 3 6 7 2). This is a permutation written in cyclic notation and not to be confused with one-line notation.

If π is a meandric permutation, then π2 consists of two cycles, one containing of all the even symbols and the other all the odd symbols. Permutations with this property are called alternate permutations, since the symbols in the original permutation alternate between odd and even integers. However, not all alternate permutations are meandric because it may not be possible to draw them without introducing a self-intersection in the curve. For example, the order 3 alternate permutation, (1 4 3 6 5 2), is not meandric.

Open meander

Given a fixed oriented line L in the Euclidean plane R2, an open meander of order n is a non-self-intersecting oriented curve in R2 which transversally intersects the line at n points for some positive integer n.  Two open meanders are said to be equivalent if they are homeomorphic in the plane.

Examples

The open meander of order 1 intersects the line once:

The open meander of order 2 intersects the line twice:

Open meandric numbers

The number of distinct open meanders of order n is the open meandric number mn. The first fifteen open meandric numbers are given below .

m1 = 1
m2 = 1
m3 = 2
m4 = 3
m5 = 8
m6 = 14
m7 = 42
m8 = 81 
m9 = 262
m10 = 538
m11 = 1828 
m12 = 3926 
m13 = 13820  
m14 = 30694  
m15 = 110954

Semi-meander

Given a fixed oriented ray R in the Euclidean plane R2, a semi-meander of order n is a non-self-intersecting closed curve in R2 which transversally intersects the ray at n points for some positive integer n.  Two semi-meanders are said to be equivalent if they are homeomorphic in the plane.

Examples

The semi-meander of order 1 intersects the ray once:

The semi-meander of order 2 intersects the ray twice:

Semi-meandric numbers

The number of distinct semi-meanders of order n is the semi-meandric number Mn (usually denoted with an overline instead of an underline). The first fifteen semi-meandric numbers are given below .

M1 = 1
M2 = 1
M3 = 2
M4 = 4
M5 = 10
M6 = 24
M7 = 66
M8 = 174
M9 = 504
M10 = 1406
M11 = 4210
M12 = 12198
M13 = 37378
M14 = 111278
M15 = 346846

Properties of meandric numbers

There is an injective function from meandric to open meandric numbers:
Mn = m2n−1

Each meandric number can be bounded by semi-meandric numbers:
Mn ≤ Mn ≤ M2n

For n > 1, meandric numbers are even:
Mn ≡ 0 (mod 2)

External links
 "Approaches to the Enumerative Theory of Meanders" by Michael La Croix

Combinatorics
Integer sequences